Jilava is a commune in Ilfov county, Muntenia, Romania, near Bucharest. It is composed of a single village, Jilava.

The name derives from a Romanian word of Slavic origin (Bulgarian жилав žilav (tough), which passed into Romanian as jilav) meaning "humid place".

In this commune there is an operating prison and also the Fort 13 Jilava.

Fort 13 Jilava

Jilava was the location of a fort built by King Carol I of Romania, as part of the capital's defense system. At a later date, the fort was converted into a prison. It is now a historical monument.

This prison is the site where, on November 26–27, 1940, the Iron Guard authorities of the National Legionary State killed 64 political prisoners as revenge for the previous killing of their leader Corneliu Zelea Codreanu (see Jilava Massacre); it was also here that Ion Antonescu, dictator (Conducător) of Romania during World War II, was executed for war crimes in 1946 and where on 23 October 1971 the serial killer, Ion Rîmaru was executed by firing squad.

The prison also was a detention site for political prisoners after the start of Communist rule in Romania. According to a study done by the International Centre for Studies into Communism, 36.1% of all such prisoners did some time at Jilava Prison. Among the political prisoners detained at Jilava were Corneliu Coposu, Richard Wurmbrand, Gen. Radu Korne, Gen. Nicolae Ciupercă, and Gen. Radu R. Rosetti, as well as Gheorghe Arsenescu, Gen. Radu Băldescu, Aristide Blank, Matei Boilă, Victor Cădere, Gen. Dumitru Carlaonț, Gen. Dumitru Coroamă, Gen. Nicolae Dăscălescu, Gen. Ioan Dumitrache, Anton Durcovici, Radu Filipescu, Paul Goma, Iuliu Hirțea, Iuliu Hossu, Ion Ioanid, George Ivașcu, Adm. Horia Macellariu, Mihail Manoilescu, Gen. Gheorghe Manoliu, Gen. Ion Negoițescu, Constantin Noica, Ovidiu Papadima, Lucrețiu Pătrășcanu, Gherman Pântea, I. Peltz, Nicolae Penescu, Constantin Titel Petrescu, Gen. David Popescu, Mihai Rădulescu, Alexander Ratiu, Nicolae Steinhardt, Alexandru Todea, Sandu Tudor, Alexandru Zub, and many others.

Natives
 Dem I. Dobrescu

See also

References

Communes in Ilfov County
Localities in Muntenia
Prisons in Romania